Henry P. Latulippe (23 April 1913 – 26 October 1995) was a Canadian businessmane and politician. Latulippe served as a Social Credit party and Ralliement créditiste member of the House of Commons of Canada. He was an industrialist and merchant by career.

He was first elected at the Compton—Frontenac riding in the 1962 general election and was re-elected there in the 1963 and 1965 federal elections. From 1963 to 1971, he was a member under the Ralliement créditiste.

Electoral district restructuring in 1966 restored the Compton riding where Latulippe was re-elected for further terms in Parliament in 1968 and 1972. He was defeated there in the 1974 federal election by Claude Tessier of the Liberal party. Latulippe was unsuccessful in unseating Tessier in the 1979 election,  when the riding became known as Mégantic—Compton—Stanstead.

Electoral history

External links
 

 Henry Latulippe fonds - Library and Archives Canada

1913 births
1995 deaths
Members of the House of Commons of Canada from Quebec
People from Chaudière-Appalaches
Social Credit Party of Canada MPs